Alfredo Casero (born 12 November 1962) is an Argentine musician, actor and comedian.

Casero began studying acting with Norman Briski in 1987. Soon after he started working in the underground humour scene of Buenos Aires. In 1992 he created, along with other humorists, the delirious comic show De la cabeza ("Out of our minds"), which later continued as Cha Cha Cha in 1995. In parallel with the television show he started working in his musical project, and also in a radio show.

The cancellation of Cha Cha Cha in 1997 marks the end of an era of famous characters, such as Manhattan Ruiz, Minister of Postal Economy. Delicatessen, Todo x 2 pesos and Peter Capusotto y sus videos were shows that took much of the former Cha Cha Cha and De la Cabeza, including many actors.

He became better known outside of his country in 2002 when he recorded a Japanese song, Shima Uta, entirely in Japanese. It was the first single from his album, Casaerius. The song became a huge hit in Argentina, where it was chosen as the anthem for the national football team to represent the country at the 2002 FIFA World Cup, in South Korea and Japan.

In 2004 Casero played the character 'Roque Rizzutti' in the Argentine soap Locas de amor.

He was featured, along with Japanese rock band The Boom (authors of Shima Uta) and Japanese-Argentine folk singer Claudia Oshiro on the Japanese New Year's Eve television show, Kōhaku Uta Gassen, in its 53rd edition (New Year's Eve, December 2002).

Since then he's been devoted to the "Casero Experimendo", an experiment of blogging/humour and theater presentations, all made around improvisation.

Filmography

Awards

Music

Film and television

References

External links
 Official website 
 
 
 Cha cha cha fans' site 

1963 births
20th-century Argentine male actors
20th-century Argentine male musicians
20th-century comedians
21st-century Argentine male actors
21st-century Argentine male musicians
21st-century comedians
Argentine comedians
Argentine film score composers
Argentine male film actors
Argentine musicians
Living people
Male film score composers
People from Vicente López Partido